Memorial Fountain and Statue are a historic fountain and statue located in Memorial Square at Chambersburg in Franklin County, Pennsylvania. They were installed in 1878, and built of cast iron.  The fountain basin is hexagonal and 30 feet in diameter.  It features eight flower vases positioned around it.  The central shaft is 26 feet high and topped by a turned finial. At the base of the shaft are four cherubs riding dolphins.  Water projects from each of the dolphin's mouths.  The statue is of a uniformed soldier with rifle, standing 6 feet tall.

It was listed on the National Register of Historic Places in 1978.  It is included in the Chambersburg Historic District.

References 

Fountains in Pennsylvania
Monuments and memorials on the National Register of Historic Places in Pennsylvania
Buildings and structures completed in 1878
Buildings and structures in Franklin County, Pennsylvania
National Register of Historic Places in Franklin County, Pennsylvania